Claysburg Air Force Station (ADC ID: P-63) is a closed United States Air Force General Surveillance Radar station. It was closed in 1961 due to budget constraints. The unit was eventually moved to Gibbsboro Air Force Station (RP-63), New Jersey.

History
Claysburg Air Force Station was part of the last batch of twenty-three radar stations constructed as part of the Air Defense Command permanent network. It was activated in April 1952, replacing the Connelsville L-16 Lashup site.  It was declared completely operational in late 1952.

The 772d Aircraft Control and Warning Squadron began operations with an AN/CPS-4 height-finder radar and AN/FPS-3 search radar, and initially the station functioned as a Ground-Control Intercept (GCI) and warning station.  As a GCI station, the squadron's role was to guide interceptor aircraft toward unidentified intruders picked up on the unit's radar scopes.   In 1956, an AN/FPS-4 replaced the AN/CPS-4 and two years later an AN/FPS-20 replaced the original AN/FPS-3 search radar.

During 1959 Claysburg AFS joined the Semi Automatic Ground Environment (SAGE) system, initially feeding data to DC-03 at Syracuse AFS, New York.  After joining, the squadron was redesignated as the 772d Radar Squadron (SAGE) on 1 February 1959.  The radar squadron provided information 24/7 the SAGE Direction Center where it was analyzed to determine range, direction altitude speed and whether or not aircraft were friendly or hostile.

This site was closed in 1961 and the 772d Radar Squadron was repositioned to an existing Army Nike Missile site at Pedricktown, NJ, which became Gibbsboro AFS, New Jersey in order to save money by combining Army and Air Force radar sites.  Today Claysburg AFS has been redeveloped into Blue Knob Ski Resort.

Air Force units and assignments

Units
 Constituted as the 772d Aircraft Warning and Control Squadron on 14 November 1950
 Activated at Connellsville, PA (L-16) on 27 November 1950
 Moved to Blue Knob Park, PA on 1 December 1951
 Blue Knob Park renamed Claysburg Air Force Station on 1 December 1953
 Redesignated 772d Radar Squadron (SAGE) on 1 February 1959
 Moved to Gibbsboro Air Force Station, NJ on 1 May 1961.

Assignments:
 503d Aircraft Control and Warning Group, 1 January 1951
 26th Air Division, 6 February 1952
 4710th Defense Wing, 16 February 1953
 4708th Air Defense Wing, 1 March 1956
 30th Air Division, 8 July 1956
 Syracuse Air Defense Sector, 15 August 1958 - 1 May 1961

See also
 List of USAF Aerospace Defense Command General Surveillance Radar Stations

References

 Cornett, Lloyd H. and Johnson, Mildred W., A Handbook of Aerospace Defense Organization  1946 - 1980,  Office of History, Aerospace Defense Center, Peterson AFB, CO (1980).
 Winkler, David F. & Webster, Julie L., Searching the Skies, The Legacy of the United States Cold War Defense Radar Program,  US Army Construction Engineering Research Laboratories, Champaign, IL (1997).

External links
 Information for Claysburg AFS, PA 
 Information for Pedricktown Army Installation (accessed 13 Dec 2011)

Radar stations of the United States Air Force
Installations of the United States Air Force in Pennsylvania
Aerospace Defense Command military installations
1952 establishments in Pennsylvania
1961 disestablishments in Pennsylvania
Military installations established in 1952
Military installations closed in 1961